Bothell is a city in King and Snohomish counties in the U.S. state of Washington. It is part of the Seattle metropolitan area, situated near the northeast end of Lake Washington. As of the 2020 census, it had a population of 48,161 residents.

History

The Sammamish River valley from Lake Washington to Issaquah Creek was historically inhabited by the indigenous Sammamish people (also known as the "s-tah-PAHBSH", or "willow people"), a Coast Salish group with an estimated population of 80 to 200 by 1850. Among them were the "ssts'p-abc" ("meander dwellers"), who settled near the river's mouth at two villages—the larger of which was "tlah-WAH-dees" between modern-day Kenmore and Bothell. The Sammamish were removed from their lands in 1856 following the Puget Sound War and moved to the Port Madison and Tulalip indian reservations.

The first American claims to the lower Sammamish River valley, then mostly a marshland, were filed in 1870 by Columbus S. Greenleaf and George R. Wilson. Eight families followed over the next six years. In 1876, Canadian George Brackett bought land and began commercial logging out of a camp located on the north bank of the Sammamish River in what is now the heart of downtown Bothell. A store, school, and sawmill followed over the next several years.

In 1885, Brackett sold  to David Bothell, a settler and American Civil War veteran from Pennsylvania. The town's first postmaster, who bought his property from Bothell, named the town in his honor when it was platted in 1888. Later that same year, a local railroad was built through the town to transport coal from Issaquah. Bothell was officially incorporated on April 14, 1909.

Bothell continued to grow as logging expanded and boat traffic brought increasing amounts of goods and passengers up and down the river. As more people moved into the area, the Army Corps of Engineers decided to dredge and straighten the river in the years shortly after Bothell's incorporation. Most boat traffic came to an abrupt end only a few years later when Lake Washington was lowered in 1917. Water transport also shifted to trucks after a brick road was built from Seattle. The logging economy declined quickly around the same time, and the local economy shifted to farming.

After World War II, better highways and a post-war boom brought suburban development to Bothell. These new neighborhoods and a series of annexations dramatically expanded Bothell's population from about 1,000 in 1950 to over 45,000 as of 2017. A failed attempt to annex part of the adjacent community of Woodinville in the 1980s led to them incorporating as a separate city in 1993. In 1992, the city annexed an area in southern Snohomish County, becoming a dual-county city and adding 11,400 people. During the decade, the city's population had increased by 144 percent to over 30,000. Bothell was mostly a bedroom community for people working in Seattle until the 1990s, when business development brought new jobs to create a regional employment center in Canyon Park with about 20,000 jobs, many in high technology sectors such as biotechnology and software development. In 1990, a campus of the University of Washington opened in Bothell.

In 2010, the city of Bothell began a $150 million program to redevelop downtown, including the demolition of 15 buildings, moving State Route 522, expanding the Bothell–Everett Highway, expanding a city park, and expanding the city hall. The realigned State Route 522 was opened in August 2013 and was followed by a redesign of Bothell Way (formerly State Route 527) in 2017 that created a wide boulevard with separate laneways for parking. The projects were originally planned to be funded with a $42 million property tax proposition that was rejected by voters in November 2014.

A major fire in downtown broke out at the Mercantile Building on July 22, 2016, damaging and closing more than 20 businesses. The fire hindered the redevelopment program and required state aid for rebuilding.

Geography

Bothell is located along the Sammamish River near its mouth at the northeast end of Lake Washington. It straddles King and Snohomish counties, which cross Bothell at Northeast 205th Street / 244th Street Southwest. Bothell is one of six cities in Washington that are in multiple counties. The city is bordered to the west by Kenmore, to the north by unincorporated North Creek, to the east by Woodinville, and to the south by Kirkland (including Juanita).

Because most streets in Bothell are numbered and not named, streets that cross the county line often change numbers. For example, 104th Avenue NE in King County becomes 23rd Avenue SE when it crosses into Snohomish County.

Most of the city drains into the Sammamish River or one of its tributaries, such as North Creek and Swamp Creek. The area has several wetlands that are home to large groups of crows, up to 16,000 at a time, that commute from the Seattle region to roost in Bothell.

Subareas and neighborhoods

As part of the city's comprehensive plan, first published in 1996, Bothell organizes neighborhoods and districts into planning subareas for zoning regulation purposes. When the plan was last updated in 2015, Bothell recognized 17 subareas, four of which were outside the current city limits; they include:
 Bloomberg Hill, a residential area on the eastern edge of the city, primarily in King County
 Brickyard Road/Queensgate, a residential area in the southeastern corner of the city
 Canyon Creek/39th Avenue SE, a residential area in the northeastern corner of the city proper
 Canyon Park, a residential and commercial area on the northern edge of the city proper
 Country Village/Lake Pleasant, a residential and commercial area situated along the Bothell-Everett Highway (formerly SR 527) between downtown and Canyon Park
 Damson/Logan, a residential area in the northwestern part of the city's planning area, just outside the city proper and west of I-405
 Downtown Bothell, located mainly on the north side of the Sammamish River in an area originally settled by pioneers. It contains a business district along Main Street, and several blocks of residences at the foot of Beckstrom Hill. It also contains city hall and the police station, the Bothell Library, and Pop Keeney Stadium.
 Filbert/Winesap, a primarily residential area in the northwestern part of the city's planning area, just outside the city proper and east of I-405
 Fitzgerald/35th Avenue SE, a residential area in the northeastern part of the city, just north of the King-Snohomish county line
 Locust/14th Avenue W, a primarily residential area in the northwestern part of the city, just outside the city proper to the north of Kenmore
 Maywood/Beckstrom Hill, a residential neighborhood on the hill extending from downtown north up to North Creek
 North Creek/NE 195th Street, a mixed residential, commercial, and light industrial area in the east-central part of the city, located mainly northeast of the interchange of I-405 and SR 522
 Queensborough/Brentwood/Crystal Springs, a residential neighborhood in the northwestern corner of the city proper
 Shelton View/Meridian/3rd Avenue SE, a residential neighborhood on the western edge of the city proper within Snohomish County
 Thrasher's Corner/Red Hawk, a residential and commercial area in the northeastern corner of the city's planning area, just outside the city proper. It is named for the Thrasher family, who opened a grocery store and gas station at the corner of the Bothell–Everett Highway and Filbert Road (now State Route 524) in 1928.
 Waynita/Simonds/Norway Hill, a residential area in the southern part of the city, roughly south of the Sammamish River. It is home to the former Wayne Golf Course, now a city-owned parkland.
 Westhill, a primarily residential area on the hill to the west of downtown

Climate
Bothell has a temperate oceanic climate, with mild summers and cool winters. Winter sees much more rainfall than summer and winters in Bothell (much like those in the rest of the Pacific Northwest) are very cloudy and overcast. Summers are drier and cool to warm.

Demographics

Bothell is the 26th largest city in Washington, with a population of 48,161 people as of the 2020 U.S. census. The city grew significantly in the 1950s, 1990s, and 2000s from the annexation of surrounding areas and suburban development. Between 2010 and 2020, Bothell's population grew by 44 percent, faster than any other city in Snohomish County and among the fastest rates in the Puget Sound region.

The city has a large concentration of Asian Americans, of which 33 percent identify as Indian and 29 percent identify as Chinese, and Hispanic/Latino Americans. Approximately 20 percent of Bothell residents were born outside the United States, an increase from 11 percent reported in 2000. The 2019 American Community Survey estimated that the median household income of the city's residents was $99,965. An evaluation by Public Health – Seattle & King County in 2016 found that residents of Bothell and Woodinville had lower prevalence of health issues and a high life expectancy of 83.4 years compared to King County and Washington state.

2020 census

As of the 2020 U.S. census, there were 48,161 people, 19,149 households, and 7,948 families residing in Bothell. There were 19,149 occupied housing units and 989 vacant units. 60 percent of the city's population, 28,956 people, resided in the King County portion of Bothell, while the remaining 19,205 lived in Snohomish County. The racial makeup of the city was 65.0% White, 1.9% African American, 0.6% Native American, 17.7% Asian, 0.2% Native Hawaiian or Pacific Islander, 4.0% from other races, and 10.6% from two or more races. Hispanic or Latino of any race were 9.2% of the population.

2010 census

As of the 2010 U.S. census, there were 33,505 people, 13,497 households, and 8,779 families residing in the city. The racial makeup of the city was 79.7% White, 1.6% African American, 0.6% Native American, 10.2% Asian, 0.2% Pacific Islander, 3.4% from other races, and 4.5% from two or more races. Hispanic or Latino of any race were 8.7% of the population.

There were 13,497 households, of which 32.0% had children under the age of 18 living with them, 51.9% were married couples living together, 9.1% had a female householder with no husband present, 4.1% had a male householder with no wife present, and 35.0% were non-families. 27.2% of all households were made up of individuals, and 8.9% had someone living alone who was 65 years of age or older. The average household size was 2.46 and the average family size was 3.00.

The median age in the city was 38.3 years. 22.4% of residents were under the age of 18; 8.1% were between the ages of 18 and 24; 29.3% were from 25 to 44; 28.1% were from 45 to 64; and 12.1% were 65 years of age or older. The gender makeup of the city was 48.8% male and 51.2% female.

Economy

In its early years, Bothell's economy was tied to the logging industry, but it became an agriculture-based economy by the 1920s; after World War II, the post-war boom transformed the town into a bedroom community. Since 1984, development in the Canyon Park and North Creek business districts has transformed Bothell into a regional employment center.

Biotechnology is a key industry, with Achieve Life Sciences, Seagen, AGC Biologics (formerly CMC Biologics and Icos), Lundbeck Seattle Biopharmaceuticals, and Blue Heron Biotechnology all having headquarters or operations in Bothell. Medical device manufacturers based in the city include Philips Medical Systems and Lockheed Martin Aculight. Bothell is also home to medical device company Ventec Life Systems, which manufactures ventilators.

Computer technology, data, and telecommunications are well represented, and include companies such as AT&T, AVST, Kinesis, Leviton Voice & Data, Systems Interface, Silicon Mechanics, Boeing, Lockheed Martin, SonoSite (owned by Fujifilm), T-Mobile, Panasonic Avionics Corporation, Parity Corporation, Allocent, Teltone, and Google. Microsoft had a Canyon Park campus in the early 2000s

Engineering firms, including electrical engineering, environmental engineering, and civil engineering, are well represented. Examples include SNC-Lavalin, RH2 Engineering, Romac Industries, North Creek Analytical, ECS Engineering, Emulex, and Path Engineers. MicroVision, Inc. was formerly headquartered in Bothell, but has since moved to Redmond.

The US Army has a Reserve facility, the Staff Sgt. Joe R. Hooper Army Reserve Center, in the northwest part of the city. It opened in 1993 and also houses the Region X headquarters of the Federal Emergency Management Agency in a former bunker. National magazine publisher Scotsman Guide Media is headquartered in the city. Defunct retailer Pacific Linen was once based in Bothell until 1996.

Culture

Arts

Bothell has several pieces of public art, primarily located in downtown or on the University of Washington Bothell and Cascadia College campus. The city government created an arts advisory committee and adopted a percent for art ordinance in 2009 to fund the creation of public artwork and other programs. The committee was replaced by a formal Arts Commission in 2017 with seven members appointed by the city council to manage and promote the public arts program. A gallery at the new city hall is curated by the Arts Commission with room for paintings, sculptures, and on-screen artwork.

The city's downtown is home to an art walk, the Bothell Art Scene, with several participating businesses and art studios. Other pieces of public art in the city include a series of murals on downtown buildings that depict  Bothell's history and pioneers. They were first painted in 1989 to honor the city's centennial, but some were lost in the late 1990s to redevelopment.

From 1981 to 2019, Bothell was home to Country Village, a themed shopping center with stores that catered towards the arts community. It had 45 independent businesses in several historic buildings that were repurposed for use by artisan stores, antique shops, and restaurants. Country Village also hosted an annual driftwood sculpture contest and the Museum of Special Art, an art museum for works created by people with disabilities.

The city's largest performing arts venue, the Northshore Performing Arts Center, opened in 2005 at Bothell High School and seats 600 people. It is operated by the Northshore School District and was funded with assistance from a volunteer organization that sought to build a regional theater at a cost of $5 million.

Events

Bothell hosts several annual events that are funded in part by private donations, sponsorships, and a hotel tax levied by the city government. Major annual events throughout the year in Bothell include:

 Bothell Block Party and BrewFest in May
 The City of Bothell Freedom Festival, a two-day festival celebrating American Independence, including an annual Fourth of July parade and a reenactment of the Battle of Concord on the Bothell Landing Bridge.
 Bothell Friday Market, weekly from June to September
 Bothell Beer Festival 
 The Music in the Park concert series, every Friday in July and August at Bothell Landing Amphitheater.
 Greater Bothell Arts & Crafts Fair
 City of Bothell Riverfest
 The Summits of Bothell bike ride
 Tree Lighting Festival and Santa Arrival, at Bothell Landing

The Cup of Kindness day, held on May 10, was cited by Reader's Digest in its awarding of "Nicest Places in America" honors to Bothell and nine other cities in 2018.

Media

Bothell has one weekly newspaper, the Bothell-Kenmore Reporter. It was first published in 1933 as the Bothell Citizen and became the Northshore Citizen in 1961 as its coverage grew outside the city's boundaries. The newspaper became a semimonthly publication in January 2002, receiving its current name in the process; the schedule change was reverted by the paper's current owner, Sound Publishing, two months after it bought the paper in November 2006. Local newspapers published before the establishment of the Reporter include the Bothell Independent and the Bothell Sentinel.

Bothell is also part of the Seattle–Tacoma media market and is served by Seattle-based media outlets. The region's largest newspaper, The Seattle Times, operated a production facility in the city's North Creek business district from 1992 to 2020, closing it amid an industry-wide decline in print revenue; the Seattle Post-Intelligencer was also printed at the facility until it shifted to online-only publication in 2009. The Snohomish County side of the city is served by The Everett Herald, a sister paper to the Reporter. Broadcast-based media outlets that serve the city include television stations KOMO-TV, KING-TV, KIRO-TV, and KCPQ; as well as various radio stations.

Library

Bothell's public library is operated by the King County Library System (KCLS), which has provided library services for it since 1946. The library was established on January 19, 1925, but it traces its history to a private library that was established on Main Street in 1905. The city council voted to move it into the city hall in 1928; both relocated to a new building in 1936. A separate,  library building was dedicated on July 6, 1969, but the library had outgrown it by 1986, when Bothell voters approved an annexation into KCLS. Initially intending to expand the 1969 building, KCLS elected to construct a  building adjacent to it instead; the new building opened on September 18, 1995.

Historic preservation

Bothell has nine properties that are listed on the National Register of Historic Places (NRHP) due to their cultural, architectural, or historic qualities. Several properties are surviving homes from early city pioneers built in the late 19th and early 20th centuries that were late moved to the Park at Bothell Landing. Other listed sites include the Bothell Pioneer Cemetery, Bates-Tanner Farm, and North Creek School at Centennial Park.

In 1987, the city government established its own local register of historic places, which is managed by the Landmark Preservation Board appointed by the city council. It has 15 properties that include those on the NRHP and the Washington State Heritage Register, as well as additional sites that are over 50 years old. One site, the Harries House and Water Tower, was delisted following its demolition in 2015 despite plans to protect it from nearby housing development.

The Bothell Historical Museum, a non-profit museum run by the local historical society, is located within the Hannan House on the grounds of the Park at Bothell Landing. It opened in 1969 and was relocated to the new park in 1978. The museum was open on Sundays until the COVID-19 pandemic suspended activities; it is furnished with contemporary artifacts from a late 19th century home and those related to the city's history. The historical society also funded several restoration projects, including work on the Beckstrom Cabin, built in 1883 and moved to the park grounds in 1979.

Sports

Pop Keeney Stadium in Downtown Bothell was built in 1920 and seats 4,438 spectators. It is primary used by high school football teams from the Northshore School District, having originally hosted only Bothell High School. The stadium was renamed during renovations in 1953 for Harold "Pop" Keeney, a local high school football coach. Its original stands were replaced in 1968 and the stadium was renovated again in 2010.

Government and politics

Bothell is a non-charter code city with a council–manager government. The city council has seven members elected in non-partisan, at-large positions to four-year terms in staggered election years. The city council passes ordinances and resolutions, approves the budget, sets policies and adjudicates issues. A mayor and deputy mayor are elected to two-year terms by the council from within their own membership. Day-to-day affairs in the city are administered by a city manager, who is hired by the council and appoints the heads of eight departments.

The city government has 387 employees and an operating budget of $266.2 million appropriated for the 2021–22 biennium, sourced primarily from property tax, service charges, and sales tax. It provides a range of municipal services, including police, fire services, emergency medical services, public works, zoning and planning, parks and recreation, and some utilities. The city's fire department has three fire stations and also contracts with Snohomish County Fire Protection District 10 for services north of the county line. Bothell City Hall, located downtown, opened in 2015; it replaced an earlier city hall built in 1938 and five other buildings in the city used by various municipal departments.

At the federal level, Bothell is part of the 1st congressional district, represented by Democrat Suzan DelBene since 2012. At the state level, the city is part of the 1st legislative district alongside Mountlake Terrace and Kirkland. Bothell is also represented by three county council districts: King County Council's 1st district covers most of the city's King County side, while a small portion belongs to the 3rd district; the Snohomish County Council's 4th district represents all of the Snohomish County side of the city.

Parks and recreation

Bothell has 26 parks, trails, and open spaces for public use that are maintained by the city government's Parks and Recreation Department. The Parks and Recreation Department also organizes recreational activities for residents at city parks and facilities, including sport leagues, concerts, yoga, and instructional classes; these programs were cancelled due to the COVID-19 pandemic. Bothell is also home a YMCA branch, senior centers, and other community organizations that provide their own recreational programs.

The Sammamish River Trail also connects to two other paved regional trails that converge in Bothell: the Burke–Gilman Trail, which runs southwest to Seattle; and the North Creek Trail, which travels to Canyon Park and is planned to reach Mill Creek and Everett in later phases. An unpaved corridor, the Tolt Pipeline Trail, runs southeast from Bothell towards Duvall and follows the route of the Tolt pipeline.

It is adjacent to the former Wayne Golf Course, which was acquired for $3.8 million by the city government between 2017 and 2018 with assistance from Forterra. The  property is the largest in Bothell's parks system and remains undeveloped except for an existing disc golf course that was retained. Connecting the river and trail to Downtown Bothell is the Park at Bothell Landing, a  park with historic buildings and a footbridge.

Bothell's largest nature preserve, North Creek Forest, was established in 2011 and sits on  surrounding North Creek near Interstate 405. It is home to large forests as well as wetlands that host band-tailed pigeons, pileated woodpeckers, and salmon in streams. The forest is managed by a volunteer group and is adjacent to state-owned wetlands on the University of Washington Bothell and Cascadia College campus. The  wetlands, the largest in the Pacific Northwest to undergo restoration, are home to habitats for deer, goats, coyotes, and other wildlife.

In addition to parks in the downtown area, Bothell has several community parks in its outlying neighborhoods. The Doug Allen Sportsfields, named in 2008 for a former city worker, has several grass fields for soccer and a baseball diamond. The North Creek Sportsfields complex comprises four fields in the North Creek business park designated for soccer, baseball, softball, lacrosse, and American football. The city's northernmost park, Centennial Park, opened in October 2008 at the former site of a Snohomish County park in Thrasher's Corner.

Education

The Northshore School District serves the cities of Bothell, Woodinville, Kenmore, and surrounding unincorporated areas in King and Snohomish counties. It is the 10th largest school district in Washington state, with 35 schools and an enrollment of 23,577 students . The district is governed by a five-member school board elected from geographic districts, of which three include portions of Bothell. Northshore was formed in 1959 from a merger of the Bothell and Woodinville school districts, which had been founded in the late 19th century.

The district operates 12 schools within Bothell city limits: one high school, three middle schools, and eight elementary schools. Bothell High School opened in 1907 to serve several rural school districts and moved between several building until its current West Hill campus was completed in 1953. The campus underwent an extensive renovation that was completed in 2008 that added classrooms, common areas, and a performing arts center. The district's other high schools, Inglemoor in Kenmore and North Creek in unincorporated Snohomish County (opened in 2017), also serve Bothell residents.

The Bothell area is also home to several private schools, including those affiliated with local churches. Among them are campuses of the Cedar Park Christian School system, including a high school in Bothell; the Providence Classical Christian School, a K–12 school founded in 1997; and St. Brendan's Catholic School, founded in 1966 and administered by the Archdiocese of Seattle. The Clearwater School, two Montessori schools, the Evergreen Academy, and the Washington Preparatory School are also located in and around Bothell.

Higher education

Bothell is home to two post-secondary educational institutions, Cascadia College and the University of Washington Bothell (UW Bothell), which share a single campus east of downtown near Interstate 405 and State Route 522. UW Bothell is one of three campuses of the University of Washington and serves 6,000 students , of which approximately 30 percent reside in Snohomish County. Cascadia College, a two-year community college,  had fewer than 3,000 enrolled students in 2019.

UW Bothell was established by the state government in 1989 alongside another branch campus in Tacoma to serve students who had graduated from two-year community colleges. Its first classes were held in October 1990 at a Canyon Park office building. At the same time, the state government approved plans to establish another community college on the Eastside to relieve overcrowding at colleges in Bellevue and Shoreline. The state government proposed replacing UW Bothell and the planned community college with a new four-year university in 1992, but opted instead to have both institutions share space on the intended site for the latter; the shared campus opened in September 2000. Further attempts to merge the institutions were rejected by students and the state government, who instead authorized an expansion of UW Bothell from an upper division school to a four-year institution beginning in 2006.

Infrastructure

Transportation

Bothell lies at the intersection of Interstate 405, a major freeway bypass of Seattle, and State Route 522, which provides connections to Seattle and Monroe. Other highways in the city's northern neighborhoods include State Route 524, which travels west to Lynnwood and east to Maltby; and State Route 527 (the Bothell–Everett Highway), which connects Bothell to Mill Creek and Everett. Prior to the opening of the new Pacific Highway between Everett and Seattle in 1927, U.S. Route 99 was routed through Bothell on modern-day State Route 522 and State Route 527.

Public transportation within the city is provided by several operators that serve hubs at the University of Washington Bothell campus, Canyon Park Park and Ride on Interstate 405, and Downtown Bothell. King County Metro has local routes connecting Bothell to nearby cities, as well as express routes traveling to North Seattle and the main University of Washington campus. Sound Transit Express operates express routes from Bothell to Seattle's Roosevelt station via State Route 522 and along Interstate 405 to Lynnwood and Downtown Bellevue. Community Transit primarily serves Snohomish County with connections at its Canyon Park hub, which is also the terminus of the Swift Green Line, a bus rapid transit line on State Route 527 that debuted in 2019. Its route connect Bothell to Lynnwood, Mill Creek, Everett, and Downtown Seattle. These agencies, along with the Washington State Department of Transportation, also operate park-and-ride lots that have a total capacity of 965 vehicles.

As part of the Sound Transit 3 program, two Stride bus rapid transit lines are planned to be built through Bothell by 2027. Line S2 will follow Interstate 405 between Lynnwood and Bellevue with stops at the University of Washington Bothell campus and Canyon Park; Line S3 on State Route 522 between Shoreline South/148th station in Shoreline and Bothell will open in 2026 with stations in Downtown Bothell and at the University of Washington Bothell campus.

In July 2019, the city government launched its dockless electric scooter sharing program with Lime.

Utilities

The delivery of electric power to residents, businesses, and buildings in Bothell is split between two providers serving different sides of the King–Snohomish county line. The Snohomish County Public Utility District provides electricity for the Snohomish County side of Bothell, along with the rest of the county; Puget Sound Energy provides electricity for the King County side and natural gas service for all of Bothell. The Bothell city government contracts with Recology for all curbside garbage, recycling, and yard waste collection and disposal. The company also has a store in Canyon Park that sells products made from recycled materials and accepts hazardous materials for recycling. Waste Management handles garbage and recycling collection outside of city limits and was also responsible for some annexed areas of Bothell until 2021.

Bothell has four water districts that provide tap water service within its city limits: the Alderwood Water and Wastewater District serving Canyon Park and the northern neighborhoods; the Bothell Water District serving Downtown Bothell and nearby neighborhoods; the Northshore Utility District serving western and southern Bothell; and the Woodinville Water District serving a small area in the city's southeastern outskirts. Alderwood sources its water from Spada Lake in Snohomish County through the City of Everett; the other three districts purchase their water from Seattle Public Utilities, which sources its supply from the Tolt River watershed in King County. The water districts also manage the wastewater and sewage systems for their respective service areas, which are pumped to the Brightwater sewage treatment plant near Woodinville for treatment. The city government is also responsible stormwater collection and treatment using a  system of storm pipes that flow into catchment ponds and detention vaults.

Healthcare

The city's nearest general hospital is EvergreenHealth Kirkland, a Level III trauma center located in the Totem Lake neighborhood of Kirkland. The King County portion of Bothell is part of the public hospital district that manages EvergreenHealth and elects one member to its board of commissioners. The northwestern outskirts of the city in Snohomish County are part of the Verdant Health Commission (Snohomish County Public Hospital District No. 2), which formerly operated Stevens Hospital (now Swedish Health Services Edmonds). Bothell is home to several small community and urgent care clinics operated by regional healthcare providers, including The Everett Clinic, HealthPoint, Indigo Health, Pacific Medical Centers, and ZoomCare. A clinic run by Public Health – Seattle & King County in southern Bothell served over 4,200 annual clients until its closure in 2014.

Notable people

 James Allsup, far-right political commentator
 Bryan Alvarez, professional wrestler and radio host
 Bernadette Bascom, singer
 Ross Bowers, American football player
 Karan Brar, actor
 Kyle Cease, comedian and actor
 Michael Dahlquist, musician
 Robert DeLong, electronic musician
 Maxine Dexter, Oregon state representative
 Michael Dong, slalom skateboarder
 Micah Downs, basketball player
 Korel Engin, basketball player
 Brenden Foster, terminal leukemia patient and activist
 Dorothy Awes Haaland, Alaskan politician
 Phil Harris, fisherman and reality TV star
 Johnny Hekker, American football player
 Shiloh Keo, American football player
 Zach LaVine, basketball player
 Blake Lewis, singer and American Idol 2007 runner-up
 Rosemary McAuliffe, state politician
 Sharon McMurtry, soccer player
 Patty Murray, U.S. Senator, President pro tempore of the United States Senate
 Mikayla Pivec, basketball player
 Arnold Riegger, trap shooter and Olympian
 Tracie Ruiz-Conforto, synchronized swimmer and Olympic medalist
 Ernie Steele, American football player
 Hal Sutherland, animator and painter
 Cody Votolato, musician for The Blood Brothers
 Chris Walla, musician for Death Cab for Cutie
 Doug Yule, musician

In popular culture
In December 1962, Life magazine recognized Bothell's  Christmas tree as the largest living Christmas tree in the world. However, in the late 1970s, disease attacked the tree, and the top had to be removed.

In 2007, about 5,000 to 7,000 people gathered for a parade and outdoor concert at the Veterans Memorial Amphitheater at Bothell Landing in honor of local American Idol contestant Blake Lewis.

References

External links

 
 

 
Cities in Washington (state)
Cities in King County, Washington
Populated places established in 1870
Cities in Snohomish County, Washington
Cities in the Seattle metropolitan area
1870 establishments in Washington Territory